Chontales is a department in Nicaragua. It covers an area of 6,481 km² and has a population of 191,856. The capital is Juigalpa. Some  of land overlooks Lake Cocibolca (Lake Nicaragua) on the western side. The department is livestock and fishing based, and is also a producer of apples.

Geography
The Chontales Department is situated in the central-southwest part of the country. It is bordered by the Boaco Department to the north, the Río San Juan Department to the south, the South Caribbean Coast Autonomous Region to the east and Lake Cocibolca to the west. Chontales geographically primarily consists of the slopes around Lake Cocibolca, the Serranía Chontaleña range and rolling hills that undulate towards the Caribbean plain. The Cuisalá, a tributary of the Mayales flows in the northwestern part of the department.

Municipalities
The department is divided administratively into 10 municipalities:

 Acoyapa
 Comalapa
 El Coral
 Juigalpa
 La Libertad
 San Francisco de Cuapa
 San Pedro de Lóvago
 Santo Domingo
 Santo Tomás
 Villa Sandino

Economy
The regional economy of Chontales is mainly based around livestock. The estates along the shore of the lake and along the road to Rama contain many plains and wet pastures to accommodate for cattle herds. The department is also a major producer of apples, producing over 743,000 apples according to one census, representing 8% of all agricultural land in Nicaragua. Mining and fishing are also conducted in the department.

Landmarks
The department contains the Arqueológico Gregorio Aguilar Barea, which has a number of indigenous artifacts attesting to the socio-cultural development of the people of Chontales throughout history. The Museo Comunitario Juigalpan María Ramos in Juigalpa reveals much about the history and identity of the region. The Reserva Natural de Amerrique is a nature reserve within the department, in a volcanic area.

References

External links
 Political map of Chontales

 
Departments of Nicaragua